DeLeon or De Leon may refer to:

DeLeon (surname)
Deleon Richards (b. 1976), US female gospel singer
DeLeon (band)
17934 Deleon, a main-belt asteroid discovered in 1999
DeLeon Springs, Florida, a census-designated place in the US state of Florida
De Leon, Texas, a city in the US state of Texas